Boris Ivanovich Ivin (1909–1942) was a Soviet Russian football player and coach.

Biography 
Boris Ivin spent his childhood in a summer cottage village near Saint Petersburg (now the Shuvalovo-Ozerki microdistrict). He was fond of football, weightlifting, skiing and ski jumping. He began to play football seriously in the team of the Vyborg district in the championship of Leningrad. From July 1929 he played for the second squad of the city's national team. In 1930 he played for the USSR national team, became its captain.

External links
 

1909 births
Footballers from Saint Petersburg
1942 deaths
Soviet footballers
FC Zenit Saint Petersburg players
Soviet football managers
FC Zenit Saint Petersburg managers
Association football midfielders
Association football forwards
FC Dynamo Odesa players